Robert John Rollins (born 30 January 1974) is a former English cricketer. Rollins was a right-handed batsman who bowled right-arm medium pace, but played primarily as a wicketkeeper.

In a career that lasted 11 years, he represented Essex in first-class cricket and List-A cricket, Cambridgeshire in Minor Counties and List-A cricket and Huntingdonshire in List-A cricket.

In his 7-year career with Essex, he forged a successful, if inconsistent first-class career.  He played 69 first-class matches, where he scored 2,258 runs at a batting average of 22.35, with 11 half centuries and a single century.  His highest score in first-class cricket was 133*.  Behind the stumps he took 158 catches and made 21 stumpings.  In List-A cricket, he played from 1993 to 2003 with a number of counties, playing a total of 109 matches, where he scored 1,197 runs at an average of 17.86.  In the process, he made 6 half centuries with a high score of 87*.  Behind the stumps he took 87 catches and made 26 stumpings.

His brother Adrian played first-class and List A cricket for Derbyshire and Northamptonshire.

References

External links
Robert Rollins at Cricinfo
Robert Rollins at CricketArchive

1974 births
Living people
People from Plaistow, Newham
English cricketers
Essex cricketers
Cambridgeshire cricketers
Huntingdonshire cricketers
NBC Denis Compton Award recipients
Black British sportspeople
Test and County Cricket Board XI cricketers